The Book of Henryków is a Latin chronicle of the Cistercian abbey in Henryków in Lower Silesia, Poland. Originally created as a registry of belongings looted during the first Mongol invasion of Poland of 1241, with time it was extended to include the history of the monastery. It is notable as the earliest document to include a sentence written entirely in what can be interpreted as an Old Polish language. Currently the book is on exhibition in the Archdiocesan Museum in Wrocław. On October 9, 2015 the Book of Henryków was entered in the list of UNESCO's "Memory of the World."

The first part of the 100-page-long book is devoted to the early history of the abbey, from its foundation by Henry the Bearded in 1227 until 1259. The second part includes the later history until 1310. In the record for 1270, a settler from the nearby village is reported to have said to his wife "Day, ut ia pobrusa, a ti poziwai." which could be roughly translated as "Let me, I shall grind, and you take a rest."

The circumstances under which this sentence was written closely reflected the cultural and literary conditions in Poland in the first centuries of its national existence. It appeared in a Latin chronicle, written by a German abbot. The man who reportedly uttered the sentence almost one hundred years earlier was Bogwal, a Czech (Bogwalus Boemus), a local settler, and subject of Bolesław the Tall, as he felt compassion for his local wife, who "very often stood grinding by the quern-stone." The local village, Brukalice, came to be named after him.

The Old Polish sentence 
The medieval recorder of this phrase, the Cistercian monk Peter of the Henryków monastery, noted "Hoc est in polonico" ("In Polish, this is") before quoting it.

"Bogwali uxor stabat, ad molam molendo. Cui vir suus idem Bogwalus, compassus dixit: Sine, ut ego etiam molam. Hoc est in polonico: Day, ut ia pobrusa, a ti poziwai." - Book of Henryków (Liber fundationis claustri Sanctae Mariae Virginis in Henrichow) 1270

See also
 Hortulus Animae

References

Bibliography

External links 
 Digitalised Book of Henryków 

History of Silesia
13th-century history books
Polish chronicles
Polish language
Earliest known manuscripts by language
13th century in Poland
13th-century Latin books
Polish non-fiction books